Jackie Jokers is a supporting character of the Richie Rich comic book franchise from Harvey Comics. He is marked by a black bowl haircut.

He debuted in 1973, in his own eponymous title, before being canceled and replaced by the title Richie Rich and Jackie Jokers later that year. He and his similar-looking father, Jerry Jokers, are both stand-up comedians. Also featured is Ben Booker, Jackie's talent agent. In every issue of Richie Rich and Jackie Jokers, a featured story would always show Jackie doing a parody of current movies, TV shows, or commercials.

Titles
 Jackie Jokers - 4 issues, 1973
 Richie Rich and Jackie Jokers -- 48 issues, 1973–82

References

External links

Harvey Comics titles
Jokers
Fictional comedians